Sahr, Sohr, SOHR or SAHR may refer to:

Iran
 Sahr, Isfahan, a village in Jabal Rural District, Kuhpayeh District, Isfahan County, Isfahan Province
 Sohr va Firuzan, a village in Sohr va Firuzan Rural District, Pir Bakran District, Falavarjan County, Isfahan Province

Other uses
 Raúl Sohr (born 1947), Chilean journalist 
 Saab Active Head Restraints (SAHR), Saab Active Head Restraint
 Society for Army Historical Research (SAHR)
 Syrian Observatory for Human Rights (SOHR)